Bocking Churchstreet is a residential area of the town of Braintree, in the Braintree district, in the English county of Essex.

Bocking Churchstreet has a school and two places of worship.

References 
Essex A-Z

Villages in Essex
Braintree, Essex